Yawhen Lebedzew (born 29 December 1994) is a Belarusian professional footballer.

References

External links
 
 

1994 births
Living people
Sportspeople from Vitebsk
Belarusian footballers
Association football forwards
FC Shakhtyor Soligorsk players
FC Granit Mikashevichi players
FC Vitebsk players
FC Naftan Novopolotsk players
FC Torpedo Minsk players
FC Orsha players
FC Slavia Mozyr players
FC Viktoryja Marjina Horka players
FC Volna Pinsk players
FC Slonim-2017 players